L'île du rêve ("The Dream Island") is an 1898 French opera set in Polynesia. It was the first opera by Reynaldo Hahn. The idylle polynésienne in three acts has a libretto by André Alexandre and Georges Hartmann, which was adapted from Pierre Loti's semi-autobiographical 1880 novel Rarahu or Le Mariage de Loti set in Tahiti. It premiered on 23 March 1898 at the Opéra-Comique in Paris.

Recording

References

External links
 

Operas by Reynaldo Hahn
French-language operas
Operas based on novels
Operas set in Oceania
Opérettes
1898 operas
Operas